The International Bridge of Integration, also known as International Bridge São Borja - St. Thomas, is a bridge across the Uruguay River, which connects the cities of São Borja in Brazil and Santo Tomé in Argentina.

References

Bridges in Brazil
Bridges in Argentina
International bridges